My Spanish Heart is the tenth solo album by Chick Corea, recorded and released in 1976. Prominent guest musicians include Corea’s Return to Forever bandmate Stanley Clarke on basses, violinist Jean-Luc Ponty, drummers Steve Gadd and Narada Michael Walden, and Corea’s wife Gayle Moran on vocals.

The album combines jazz fusion pieces and more traditional Latin music pieces. The album includes use of full brass and string sections on some tracks. "El Bozo" suite relies heavily on the use of synthesizers while "Spanish Fantasy" suite is mostly acoustic. The first four tracks form a suite as well. “Armando’s Rhumba” is now widely considered a jazz standard.

Critical reception 
My Spanish Heart received a five-star review from DownBeat magazine.

Track listing
All tracks composed by Chick Corea (except "The Hilltop" w/ Stanley Clarke)

Side one
 "Love Castle" – 4:45
 "The Gardens" – 3:12
 "Day Danse" – 4:27
 "My Spanish Heart" – 1:37
 "Night Streets" – 6:08

Side two
 "The Hilltop" – 6:16
 "The Sky (Children Song No. 8 / Portrait of Children Song No. 8)" – 4:57
 "Wind Danse" – 5:00

Side three
 "Armando's Rhumba" – 5:19
 El Bozo – 12:02
 "Prelude to El Bozo" – 1:34
 "El Bozo, Part 1 – 2:52
 "El Bozo, Part 2" – 2:03
 "El Bozo, Part 3" – 5:03

Side four
 Spanish Fantasy – 20:42
 "Spanish Fantasy, Part 1" – 6:06
 "Spanish Fantasy, Part 2" – 5:14
 "Spanish Fantasy, Part 3" – 3:06
 "Spanish Fantasy, Part 4" – 5:16

Bonus track
 "The Clouds" – 4:33

Note: "The Sky" was omitted in CD editions released during the 1980s and 1990s due to efforts to make the whole double-LP to fit to one CD. This track is included in recent CD editions (the absolute length of audio CDs has increased over the years due to more efficient designing systems) along with the previously unreleased track "The Clouds". Due to consolidation in the record industry over the later part of the 20th century, recent issues of the album are now on Verve Records, a label that specializes in jazz.

Personnel
 Chick Corea – acoustic piano, Fender Rhodes electric piano, Yamaha electric organ, synthesizers (ARP Odyssey, Minimoog, Polymoog, Moog Model 15 modular synthesizer), percussion, vocals, production, arrangement, composer
 Stanley Clarke – double bass, bass guitar
 Steve Gadd – drums
 Narada Michael Walden – drums, handclaps
 Don Alias – percussion
 Jean-Luc Ponty – violin
 Gayle Moran – vocals
 String quartet:
Connie Kupka – violin
Barry Socher – violin
Carole Mukogawa – viola
David Speltz – cello
 Brass section:
Stuart Blumberg – trumpet
John Rosenburg – trumpet
John Thomas – trumpet
Ron Moss – trombone

Charts

References

External links 
 Chick Corea - My Spanish Heart (1976) album review by Thom Jurek, credits & releases at AllMusic
 Chick Corea - My Spanish Heart (1976) album releases & credits at Discogs
 Chick Corea - My Spanish Heart (1976, Remastered 2000 with Bonus Track) album to be listened as stream on Spotify

1976 albums
Chick Corea albums
Polydor Records albums